Metallisydän ("Metal Heart") is a 2003 album by the Finnish rock group Maj Karman Kauniit Kuvat.

Track listing
 "Iso mies pohjoisesta" - 2:51
 "Metallisydän" - 3:18
 "Ritarisydän" - 3:13
 "Liskokuninkaan poika" - 2:54
 "Rocktähti muistelee" - 2:45
 "Elena Leeve" - 4:02
 "Lady Day on kuollut" - 4:22
 "Arpi" - 2:54
 "Raskaat linnut" - 3:29
 "Jonnat tulevat" - 2:17
 "Katutyttöjen laulu" - 3:15
 "Satulaulu" - 4:00

External links
  Maj Karma discography at group's official website

2003 albums